Nana Kwame Appiasei (born March 12, 1977) known professionally as Smallgod, is a Ghanaian music entrepreneur, culture and streetwear connoisseur for years who has finally taking a leap of faith to be an artist. His contributions to the Ghanaian music industry have earned him numerous accolades, the most prominent being, 'Abonten Father.

Early life
Smallgod during his early life had to move around a lot. He was raised between London, Ghana and The Netherlands. These various cultures unite to form a peculiar taste in music; which goes beyond cultures and genres and signifies Smallgod’s distinct music career today.

Career 
He started dabbling into music by opening a night club called 'Basement' in 2003 which he run for 4 years. Through that, he met a lot of artists during that time and started managing Ghanaian Reggae act Black Prophet, and then went on to sign Ghanaian rapper J-Town. During this time, he was connecting and helping many of the Ghanaian artists who were emerging at the time. Years down the line, he managed Nigerian Alté artist Wavy The Creator and Ghanaian-UK rapper and singer Eugy official.
He also owns a record label and publishing company called Nasecworld with London-rapper Lp2loose as the current signing.
Smallgod is also a huge fashion enthusiast, having done clothing collaborations with some local and diaspora fashion brands like ‘FREE THE YOUTH,’ ‘Daily Paper,’ ‘FILLING PIECES,’ ‘STEELO,’ ‘area boys,’ ‘BIKERZ SUNDAYS,’ ‘THE NEW ORIGINALS’ and ‘Xpltcstudio'

Recognition
Smallgod has always been a people's person, and in the limelight. This has led to him being referred to as the 'Accra President.' He's the first point of contact for foreign artists coming into Ghana, and Ghanaian artists going to the diaspora. Smallgod is associated with the likes of Wizkid, Tiwa Savage, Tory Lanez, Sarkodie, Headie One, King Promise, Black Sherif and others. This, in addition to his music and other endeavours has gained him wide publicity; seeing him featured in GQ magazine twice, as well as VOGUE, EBONY and INDUSTRIE AFRICA.

Discography

Albums

Building Bridges. (2021) 
 Intro (In The Line) ft Eddie Kadi
 Simple Instruction ft R2Bees
 Never Leave Me Solo ft Amartey & Terri
 Let Them Kno ft Tiwa Savage, Kwesi Arthur
 Give it to Me ft 2Baba
 Interlude (Still In Line pt. 1) ft Eddie Kadi
 This is Love ft Efya, Henry X
 Nice Life ft Busiswa
 Lingo ft Rich2Gether
 Salam Aleikum ft Jayboogz, Darkovibes
 I Go Give ft Shatta Wale, DJ Tunez, Eugy
 Interlude (Still In Line pt. 2) ft Eddie Kadi
 Fa Ma Mi ft Kwamz & Flava, King Promise, Eugy
 Marry Me ft Harmonize
 She Like Money ft Kojo Funds, Lp2loose, Di-Meh, OB, Diztortion
 I Know ft DYSTINCT
 Somebody ft Wavy The Creator, Samini, T'neeya
 Pree Me ft Lp2loose, Kojo Funds 
 Sinner ft Headie One, O'Kenneth, Kwaku DMC, Lp2loose
 Outro (Never Got In) ft Eddie Kadi

Connecting the Dots. (2022) 
 Falling ft KiDi, Darkoo
 My Way ft Headie One, Eugy, Medikal
 Tried & Tried ft NSG, Darkovibes
 Tonight ft Efya, WES7AR 22, Kofi Mole
 Do You ft Teezee, Nonso Amadi, Acebergtm
 So Amsterdam ft Boj, Mugeez, Diquenza
 2000 ft Major League Djz, GuiltyBeatz, WES7AR 22, Uncle Vinny
 Paradise ft Alpha P
 Biou Biou ft Oxlade
 Holy F4k ft Black Sherif, VIC MENSA, Ivorian Doll, Kwaku DMC
 I Know ft Kuami Eugene, BNXN fka Buju
 Africa ft Mzvee, Terry Africa
 Holy F4k - Remix ft Yssi SB, Adje, Black Sherif

Singles 
 GIDI GIDI ft Black Sherif, Tory Lanez (2022)
 Velletjes (Amapiano Remix) - Smallgod, Major League Djz, Rich2Gether (2022)
 My Way ft Headie One, Eugy, Medikal (2022)
 Holy F4k - Remix ft Yssi SB, Adje, Black Sherif (2022)
 Falling ft KiDi, Darkoo (2022)
 Holy F4k ft Black Sherif, VIC MENSA, Ivorian Doll, Kwaku DMC (2021)
 2000 ft Major League Djz, GuiltyBeatz, WES7AR 22, Uncle Vinny (2021)
 Sinner ft Headie One, O'Kenneth, Kwaku DMC, Lp2loose (2021)
 Simple Instruction ft R2Bees (2021)
 Marry Me ft Harmonize (2021)

References

1977 births
Living people
21st-century Ghanaian male singers
Ghanaian businesspeople
Male singer-songwriters